This list covers the locomotives and railbuses operated by the Royal Württemberg State Railways (Königlich Württembergische Staats-Eisenbahnen), the national railway company of Württemberg, a state in southwest Germany that was part of the German Empire. In 1920 the Royal Württemberg State Railways, along with the other German state railways (Länderbahnen), were merged into the Deutsche Reichsbahn.

Locomotive classification 

The Württemberg state railway first divided its locomotives into classes in 1845. This first categorisation into classes I to VII was based on the order in which individual vehicles were procured.

The scheme proved to be unworkable in practice, so in 1858 a new system was introduced as follows:

 A - Light express and fast-stopping train locomotives
 B - Heavy express and fast-stopping train locomotives
 C - Light passenger train locomotives
 D - Heavy passenger train locomotives
 E - Light goods train locomotives
 F – Heavy goods train locomotives
 T - Tank locomotives

In several cases the previous classes were simply redesignated. In other cases new locomotives and rebuilds were grouped together into one class despite being of different designs. 
Over the course of time, the shortcomings of the system became apparent. In particular, the division of locomotives into 'light' and 'heavy' groups was unfortunate. The classification scheme was also no longer sufficient for new locomotives. As a result, it was changed slightly in 1892. On retirement, classes that became 'free' were used again.

 A to E  - Passenger train locomotives
 F to K - Goods train locomotives
 T - Tank locomotives

Individual classes were differentiated by means of lower case letters in order to be able to indicate certain characteristics, as well as by Arabic numerals to distinguish the individual designs.

 a  - Older locomotives
 aa - Very old, ready for retirement
 c - Compounds (Verbundtriebwerk)
 d - duplex (double drive = Mallet)
 h - Superheated locomotive
 n  - Branch line locomotive
 z - Rack railway locomotive
 s - Narrow gauge locomotive,  gauge
 ss - Narrow gauge locomotive,  gauge

Furthermore, several special abbreviations were introduced, such as KL for small locomotives, DW for steam railbuses, BW for petrol railbuses and AW for accumulator cars.

Württemberg locomotives were given names up to 1896. Subjects for locomotive names were generally geographical features (towns and rivers). Very often, locomotives were given names from their area of operations. On being transferred elsewhere, their names were usually changed.

In addition to names, locomotives were also given numbers. Up to 1890, they were sequentially numbered from 1 - 377. From that time onwards, newly procured locomotives in each class were given a special group of numbers, generally one hundred, beginning at  401.

On rebuilding, locomotives were organised into new classes, but the individual locos each retained their old operating numbers.

Steam locomotives

Early locomotives for all traffic types 

The majority of these locomotives were rebuilt between 1867 and 1893. None were given operating numbers by the Deutsche Reichsbahn.

Passenger and express train locomotives

Goods train locomotives

Tank locomotives

Rack railway locomotives 

Württemberg rack railway locomotives were built for the Honau–Lichtenstein rack railway and Freudenstadt–Klosterreichenbach routes.

Rebuild locomotives 

The Royal Württemberg State Railways rebuilt older locomotives in order to re-use them and they did so to a much greater extent than other German state railways. This conversion activity may be divided into two periods of time: in the first one, from 1867 to 1887, under senior engineers Brockmann and Gross, older 2'B locomotives were rebuilt into rigid-axled 1B engines and tank locomotives of various wheel arrangements. Under chief engineers Adolf Klose and Eugen Kittel, the last remaining 2'B locomotives were also rebuilt into tank locomotives during the second conversion period between 1887 and 1910, and older 1B and C types, some of which themselves had already been rebuilt once before, were converted to match the newer locomotive types in appearance and performance.

First conversion period 1867–1887

Second conversion period 1887–1910

Narrow gauge locomotives

1000 mm gauge 

The Württemberg metre gauge locomotives were built specifically for the Nagold-Altensteig route.

750 mm gauge 

The Württemberg  gauge locomotives were procured for following routes:

 Bottwartal line (Marbach–Beilstein–Heilbronn)
 Zabergäu line (Lauffen–Güglingen–Leonbronn)
 Federsee line (Schussenried–Buchau–Riedlingen)
 Öchsle narrow gauge line (Biberach–Warthausen–Ochsenhausen)

Railbuses

See also 
History of rail transport in Germany
History of the railway in Württemberg
Länderbahnen
Kingdom of Württemberg
Royal Württemberg State Railways
UIC classification

References 

 
 
 
 
 

Defunct railway companies of Germany
Locomotives of Germany
 
Deutsche Reichsbahn-Gesellschaft locomotives
Transport in Baden-Württemberg
Württemberg
Baden-Württemberg-related lists
Wurttemberg